Warrix Sport is a Thai sport manufacturing company established in 2013 which produces jerseys, sports outfits, training equipment, etc. The word "Warrix" is inspired by the word "warrior" and theme of the brand involves legendary Thai warriors. Starting from January 2017, WARRIX is the main sponsor for Thailand national Football Team.  The brand made its first official appearance by sponsoring Thai League teams Chiangmai F.C. and Nakhon Ratchasima F.C. in 2014.

Brands
 WARRIX

Sponsorships

Football

National Teams 

 2017–
 2018–

In 2016, Warrix won the bid as the official sponsor of the Thailand National Football Team with a total sum of 400 million Baht. The contract lasts from January 1, 2017, until December 31, 2020. Warrix named its first two kits for the Thailand National Football Team Chayanuparb and Prabtrichak, which comes after the name of two legendary Thai warriors. The kit was debuted when Thailand played Saudi Arabia in the 2018 FIFA World Cup qualification on February 9, 2017.

Referees
 AFF

Domestic Leagues
Warrix provides its official balls for the following football associations:
 Myanmar National League

Club Teams
 Melawati
 Rakhine United
 Suphanburi 
 Chainat Hornbill 
 Angthong 
 BTU United 
 Kalasin 
 Nongbua Pitchaya 
 Simork
 PTT Rayong 
 BG Pathum United 
 Hougang United 
 Tiong Bahru 
 Singapore Cricket Club

References

External links
 WARRIX Official website

Thai brands
Shoe brands
Sportswear brands
Companies established in 2013
Shoe companies of Thailand
2013 establishments in Thailand
Sporting goods manufacturers of Thailand